Reed Creek is a census-designated place (CDP) in Hart County, Georgia, United States. The population was 2,604 at the 2010 census, up from 2,148 at the 2000 census.

Geography

Reed Creek is located in northeastern Hart County at  (34.441880, -82.914186). It is bordered to the north and east by Lake Hartwell on the Savannah River, which separates the community from the state of South Carolina.

The main primary highway in Reed Creek is Georgia State Route 51 which runs north out of Hartwell, Georgia to Reed Creek.

Demographics
As of the census of 2000, there were 2,148 people, 965 households, and 711 families residing in the CDP. The racial makeup of the CDP was 97.58% White, 1.49% African American, 0.14% Native American, 0.23% Asian, and 0.56% from two or more races. Hispanic or Latino of any race were 0.05% of the population.

There were 965 households, out of which 19.6% had children under the age of 18 living with them, 66.2% were married couples living together, 4.9% had a female householder with no husband present, and 26.3% were non-families. 23.2% of all households were made up of individuals, and 11.8% had someone living alone who was 65 years of age or older.  The average household size was 2.23 and the average family size was 2.59.

In the CDP, the population was spread out, with 16.9% under the age of 18, 4.7% from 18 to 24, 22.0% from 25 to 44, 30.3% from 45 to 64, and 26.2% who were 65 years of age or older.  The median age was 50 years. For every 100 females, there were 101.3 males.  For every 100 females age 18 and over, there were 99.0 males.

The median income for a household in the CDP was $41,125, and the median income for a family was $47,321. Males had a median income of $29,141 versus $19,815 for females. The per capita income for the CDP was $23,640.  About 7.4% of families and 12.3% of the population were below the poverty line, including 27.8% of those under age 18 and 6.3% of those age 65 or over.

Attraction
Lake Hartwell, which covers approximately 56,000 square acres.

References

Census-designated places in Hart County, Georgia
Census-designated places in Georgia (U.S. state)